Silk-cotton tree is a common name for several plants and may refer to:

Bombax ceiba, native to the Asian tropics
Ceiba pentandra, native to the American tropics and west Africa
Cochlospermum religiosum, native to the Asian tropics